Vallés is a municipality in the comarca of Costera in the Valencian Community, Spain.

References

Municipalities in the Province of Valencia
Costera